Massospondylus (from Greek,  (massōn, "longer") and  (spondylos, "vertebra")) is a genus of sauropodomorph dinosaur from the Early Jurassic. (Hettangian to Pliensbachian ages, ca. 200–183 million years ago). It was described by Sir Richard Owen in 1854 from remains discovered in South Africa, and is thus one of the first dinosaurs to have been named. Fossils have since been found at other locations in South Africa, Lesotho, and Zimbabwe. Material from Arizona's Kayenta Formation, India, and Argentina has been assigned to the genus at various times, but the Arizonan and Argentinian material are now assigned to other genera.

The type species is M. carinatus; seven other species have been named during the past 150 years, but only M. kaalae is still considered valid. Early sauropodomorph systematics have undergone numerous revisions during the last several years, and many scientists disagree where exactly Massospondylus lies on the dinosaur evolutionary tree. The family name Massospondylidae was once coined for the genus, but because knowledge of an early sauropod relationship is in a state of flux, it is unclear which other dinosaurs—if any—belong in a natural grouping of massospondylids; several 2007 papers support the family's validity.

Although Massospondylus was long depicted as quadrupedal, a 2007 study found it to be bipedal. It was probably a plant eater (herbivore), although it is speculated that the early sauropodomorphs may have been omnivorous. On each of its forefeet, it bore a sharp thumb claw that was used in defense or feeding. Recent studies indicate that Massospondylus grew steadily throughout its lifespan, possessed air sacs similar to those of birds, and may have cared for its young.

History of discovery

The first fossils of Massospondylus were described by paleontologist Sir Richard Owen in 1854. Originally, Owen did not recognize the finds as those of a dinosaur; instead he attributed them to "large, extinct, carnivorous reptiles" that were related to modern lizards, chameleons, and iguanas. The material, a collection of 56 bones, was found in 1853 by the government surveyor Joseph Millard Orpen in the Upper Elliot Formation at Harrismith, South Africa and was donated to the Hunterian Museum at the Royal College of Surgeons in London. Among the remains were vertebrae from the neck, back, and tail; a shoulder blade; a humerus; a partial pelvis; a femur; a tibia; and bones of the hands and feet. All these bones were found disarticulated, making it difficult to determine if all material belongs to a single species or not. However, Owen was able to distinguish three different types of caudal vertebrae, which he attributed to three different genera: Pachyspondylus, Leptospondylus and Massospondylus. Massospondylus was separated from the other two genera on the basis of its much longer caudal vertebrae, which also led to the scientific name that has been derived from the Greek terms masson/μάσσων 'longer' and spondylos/σπόνδυλος 'vertebra', explained by Owen as "because the vertebrae are proportionally longer than those of the extinct Crocodile called Macrospondylus". However, later it was shown that the putative caudal vertebrae of Massospondylus were actually cervical vertebrae and that all the material probably belongs only to a single species. On May 10, 1941, the Hunterian Museum was demolished by a German bomb, destroying all the fossils; only casts remain. Because the plaster casts of the lost type specimen fossils were not adequate to accurately diagnose a genus and species under modern taxonomic practices and for research purposes, Yates and Barrett (2010) designated BP/1/4934, a skull and a largely complete postcranial skeleton in the Bernard Price Institute for Palaeontological Research, as the neotype specimen.

Massospondylus remains have been found in the Upper Elliot Formation, the Clarens Formation, and the Bushveld Sandstone of South Africa and Lesotho, as well as the Forest Sandstone of Zimbabwe. These remains consist of at least 80 partial skeletons and four skulls, representing both juveniles and adults. The report of Massospondylus from Arizona's Kayenta Formation is based on a skull described in 1985. The skull of the Kayenta specimen from Arizona is 25% larger than the largest skull from any African specimen. The Kayenta specimen possesses four teeth in the premaxilla and sixteen in the maxilla. Uniquely among dinosaurs, it also had tiny, one-millimetre-(0.04 in-) long palatal teeth. A 2004 restudy of African Massospondylus skulls, however, indicated that the Kayenta specimen did not pertain to Massospondylus. This Kayenta skull and associated postcranial elements, identified collectively as MCZ 8893, was referred to the new genus Sarahsaurus in 2010.

Massospondylus had also been reported from Argentina, but the material has been reassessed as a closely related but distinct genus. The fossils included several partial skeletons and at least one skull, found in the Lower Jurassic Canon del Colorado Formation of San Juan, Argentina. lt was assigned to Adeopapposaurus in 2009. A specimen from South Africa previously assigned to Massospondylus, BP/1/4779, became the holotype of the new genus and species Ngwevu intloko in 2019.

Species
 
Many species have been named, although most are no longer considered valid. M. carinatus, named by Richard Owen, is the type species. Other named species include: M. browni Seeley, 1895, M. harriesi Broom 1911, M. hislopi Lydekker, 1890, M. huenei Cooper, 1981, M. kaalae Barrett 2009, M. rawesi Lydekker, 1890, and M. schwarzi Haughton, 1924.

M. browni, M. harriesi, and M. schwarzi were all found in the Upper Elliot Formation of Cape Province, South Africa. All three are based on fragmentary material, and were regarded as indeterminate in the most recent review. M. browni is based on two cervical, two back, and three caudal vertebrae and miscellaneous hind limb elements. M. harriesi is known from a well-preserved forelimb and parts of a hindlimb. M. schwarzi is known from an incomplete hind limb and sacrum. M. hislopi and M. rawesi were named from fossils found in India. M. hislopi is based on vertebrae from the Upper Triassic Maleri Formation of Andhra Pradesh, whereas M. rawesi is based on a tooth from the Upper Cretaceous Takli Formation of Maharashtra. M. hislopi was tentatively retained as an indeterminate sauropodomorph in the latest review, but M. rawesi may be a theropod or nondinosaur. M. huenei is a combination derived by Cooper for Lufengosaurus huenei, as he considered Lufengosaurus and Massospondylus to be synonyms. This synonymy is no longer accepted.

M. kaalae was described in 2009 on the basis of a partial skull from the Upper Elliot Formation in Eastern Cape of South Africa. The species is known from the same time and region as some specimens of M. carinatus. It differs from the type species in the morphology of the braincase, as well as in several other characters of the skull such as the proportions of the premaxilla.

Dubious names
Several genera have been previously synonymized with Massospondylus. These include the above-mentioned Leptospondylus and Pachyspondylus, as well as Aristosaurus, Dromicosaurus, Gryponyx taylori and Hortalotarsus, which are dubious names of little scientific value. Together with Massospondylus carinatus, Owen named Leptospondylus capensis and Pachyspondylus orpenii for vertebrae from the same unit and location. Aristosaurus erectus was named by E.C.N. van Hoepen in 1920 based on a nearly complete skeleton, and Hoepen also named Dromicosaurus gracilis, which consisted of a partial skeleton. Gryponyx taylori was named by Sidney H. Haughton in 1924. It consists of hip bones. All of the above fossils come from the Hettangian or Sinemurian faunal stages of South Africa, where Massospondylus has been found. Under the rules of zoological nomenclature, these names are junior synonyms. Massospondylus was described in a scientific paper; therefore the name Massospondylus takes priority.

Ignavusaurus, known from a young specimen, was considered by Yates et al. (2011) to be a probable synonym of Massospondylus. Cladistic analyses by Chapelle & Choiniere (2018) and Chapelle et al. (2019) agreed with Yates et al. (2011) in demonstrating the massospondylid nature of Ignavusaurus, but nevertheless recovered it as a distinct taxon of massospondylid.

Description

It was a typical early sauropodomorph, with a slender body, a long neck and a proportionally very small head. 
 
The vertebral column was composed of nine cervical (neck) vertebrae, 13 dorsal (back) vertebrae, three sacral (hip) vertebrae, and at least 40 caudal (tail) vertebrae. The pubis faced forward, as with most saurischians. It had a slighter build than that of Plateosaurus, an otherwise similar dinosaur. The neck was proportionally longer than in most other plateosaurids, with the foremost cervicals being four times the length of their width. The forelimbs were only half the length of the hindlimbs but quite powerful, as indicated by the broad upper end of the humerus that provided attachment areas for a large arm musculature. Like Plateosaurus, it had five digits on each hand and foot. The hand was short and wide, with a large sickle shaped thumb claw used for feeding or defense against predators. The thumb was the longest finger in the hand, while the fourth and fifth digits were tiny, giving the forepaws a lopsided look.

Cranial anatomy 
The small head of Massospondylus was approximately half the length of the femur. Numerous openings, or fenestrae, in the skull reduced its weight and provided space for muscle attachment and sensory organs. These fenestrae were present in pairs, one on each side of the skull. At the front of the skull were two large, elliptical nares, which were roughly half the size of the orbits. The orbits were proportionally larger in Massospondylus than in related genera, such as Plateosaurus. The antorbital fenestrae, smaller than those seen in Plateosaurus, were situated between the eyes and the nose. At the rear of the skull were two more pairs of temporal fenestrae: the lateral temporal fenestrae immediately behind the eye sockets, which were shaped like an inverted "T" in Massospondylus, and the supratemporal fenestrae on top of the skull. Small fenestrae also penetrated each mandible. The shape of the skull is traditionally restored as wider and shorter than that of Plateosaurus, but this appearance may be due just to differential crushing experienced by the various specimens. Some features of the skull are variable between individuals; for example, the thickness of the upper border of the orbit and the height of the posterior maxilla. These differences may be due to sexual dimorphism or individual variation.

Tooth count is variable between individuals and increases with skull size. The premaxilla shows the constant number of four teeth per side in all known skulls; however, in the maxilla, the tooth count ranges from 14 to 22. There are 26 teeth in each side of the lower jaw in the largest known skull. The height of the teeth crowns decreases from front to back in the upper jaw, but was more or less constant in the lower jaw. The lack of pronounced tooth wear and the variable height of the crowns suggests that the teeth were replaced by succeeding new ones in relatively short time intervals. Notably, there was variation in the tooth morphology based on the position of the teeth in the jaw. The heterodonty present in Massospondylus is greater than that present in Plateosaurus, although not as pronounced as the specialization of teeth in Heterodontosaurus. Teeth closer to the front of the snout had round cross-sections and tapered to points, unlike the back teeth, which were spatulate and had oval cross-sections.

As with other early sauropodomorphs, it has been proposed that Massospondylus had cheeks. This theory was proposed because there are a few large holes for blood vessels on the surfaces of the jaw bones, unlike the numerous small holes present on the jaws of cheekless reptiles. The cheeks would have prevented food from spilling out when Massospondylus ate. Crompton and Attridge (1986) described skulls of Massospondylus as possessing pronounced overbites and suggested the presence of a horny beak on the tip of the lower jaw to make up the difference in length and account for tooth wear on the teeth at the tip of the snout. However, the difference in length may be a misinterpretation based on crushing in a top–bottom plane, and the possession of a beak is considered unlikely in recent studies.

Classification
Basal sauropodomorph systematics continue to undergo revision, and many genera once considered classic "prosauropods" have recently been removed from the group in phylogenetic nomenclature, on the grounds that their inclusion would not constitute a clade (a natural grouping containing all descendants of a single common ancestor). Yates and Kitching (2003) published a clade consisting of Riojasaurus, Plateosaurus, Coloradisaurus, Massospondylus, and Lufengosaurus. Galton and Upchurch (2004) included Ammosaurus, Anchisaurus, Azendohsaurus, Camelotia, Coloradisaurus, Euskelosaurus, Jingshanosaurus, Lessemsaurus, Lufengosaurus, Massospondylus, Melanorosaurus, Mussaurus, Plateosaurus, Riojasaurus, Ruehleia, Saturnalia, Sellosaurus, Thecodontosaurus, Yimenosaurus and Yunnanosaurus in a monophyletic Prosauropoda. Wilson (2005) considered Massospondylus, Jingshanosaurus, Plateosaurus, and Lufengosaurus a natural group, with Blikanasaurus and Antetonitrus possible sauropods. Bonnan and Yates (2007) considered Camelotia, Blikanasaurus and Melanorosaurus possible sauropods. Yates (2007) placed Antetonitrus, Melanorosaurus, and Blikanasaurus as basal sauropods and declined to use the term Prosauropoda, as he considered it synonymous with Plateosauridae. However, he did not rule out the possibility that a small group of prosauropods consisting of Plateosaurus, Riojasaurus, Massospondylus and their closest kin were monophyletic.

Massospondylus is the type genus of the proposed family Massospondylidae, to which it gives its name. The Massospondylidae may also include Yunnanosaurus, although Lu et al. (2007) placed Yunnanosaurus in its own family. Yates (2007) considered Massospondylus, Coloradisaurus, and Lufengosaurus massospondylids, with Yunnanosaurus in Anchisauria. Smith and Pol (2007) also found a Massospondylidae in their phylogenetic analysis, including Massospondylus, Coloradisaurus, and Lufengosaurus, as well as their new genus, Glacialisaurus. Adeopapposaurus, based on the fossils once thought to belong to a South American form of Massospondylus, was also classified as a massospondylid, as was Leyesaurus, another South American genus that was named in 2011. Pradhania was originally regarded as a more basal sauropodomorph but new cladistic analysis performed by Novas et al., 2011 suggests that Pradhania is a massospondylid. Pradhania presents two shared traits of the Massospondylidae recovered in their phylogenetic analysis, and the fossils of Pradhania were discovered from the same region and basin in India as M. hislopi.
 
The following cladogram shows the position of Massospondylus within Massospondylidae, according to Fernando E. Novas and colleagues, 2011:

The following cladogram shows the position of Massospondylus within Massopoda, according to Oliver W. M. Rauhut and colleagues, 2020:

Paleobiology

As with all dinosaurs, much of the biology of Massospondylus, including its behavior, coloration, and physiology, remains unknown. However, recent studies have allowed for informed speculation on subjects such as growth patterns, diet, posture, reproduction, and respiration.

A 2007 study suggested that Massospondylus may have used its short arms for defense against predators ("defensive swats"), in intraspecies combat, or in feeding, although its arms were too short to reach its mouth. Scientists speculate that Massospondylus could have used its large pollex (thumb) claw in combat, to strip plant material from trees, digging, or for grooming.

Growth

A 2005 study indicated that Massospondylus''' sister taxon, Plateosaurus, exhibited growth patterns affected by environmental factors. The study indicated that, when food was plentiful or when the climate was favorable, Plateosaurus exhibited accelerated growth. This pattern of growth is called "developmental plasticity". It is unseen in other dinosaurs, including Massospondylus, despite the close relationship between the two. The study indicated that Massospondylus grew along a specific growth trajectory, with little variation in the growth rate and ultimate size of an individual. Another study of age determination indicated that Massospondylus grew at a maximum rate of 34.6 kg (76.3 lb) per year and was still growing at around 15 years of age.

Diet
Early sauropodomorphs such as Massospondylus may have been herbivorous or omnivorous. As recently as the 1980s, paleontologists debated the possibility of carnivory in the "prosauropods". However, the hypothesis of carnivorous "prosauropods" has been discredited, and all recent studies favor a herbivorous or omnivorous lifestyle for these animals. Galton and Upchurch (2004) found that cranial characteristics (such as jaw articulation) of most basal sauropodomorphs are closer to those of herbivorous reptiles than those of carnivorous ones, and the shape of the tooth crown is similar to those of modern herbivorous or omnivorous iguanas. The maximum width of the crown was greater than that of the root, resulting in a cutting edge similar to those of extant herbivorous or omnivorous reptiles. Barrett (2000) proposed that basal sauropodomorphs supplemented their herbivorous diets with small prey or carrion. Gastroliths (gizzard stones) have been found in association with three Massospondylus fossils from the Forest-Sandstone in Zimbabwe, and with a Massospondylus-like animal from the Late Triassic of Virginia. Until recently, scientists believed that these stones functioned as a gastric mill to aid ingestion of plant material, compensating for its inability to chew, as it is the case in many modern birds. However, Wings and Sander (2007) showed that the polished nature and the abundance of those stones precluded a use as an effective gastric mill in most non-theropod dinosaurs, including Massospondylus.

Gait and range of motion

Although long assumed to have been quadrupedal, a 2007 anatomical study of the forelimbs has questioned this, arguing that their limited range of motion precluded effective habitual quadrupedal gait. Neither could the forelimbs swing fore and behind in a fashion similar to the hindlimbs, nor could the hand be rotated with the palmar surfaces facing downwards. This inability to pronate the hand is also supported by in-situ finds of articulated (still-connected) arms that always show unrotated hands with palmar faces facing each other. The study also ruled out the possibility of "knuckle-walking" and other forms of locomotion that would make an effective locomotion possible without the need to pronate the hand. Although its mass suggests a quadrupedal nature, Massospondylus would have been restricted to its hind legs for locomotion.

Since the discovery of rudimentary and nonfunctional clavicles in ceratopsians, it was assumed that these shoulder bones were reduced in all dinosaurs that did not have true furculae. Robert Bakker (1987) suggested that this would have allowed the shoulder blades to swing with the forelimbs in quadrupedal dinosaurs, increasing their functional forelimb length. This would have reduced the discrepancy of length between fore- and hindlimbs in a quadrupedal Massospondylus. However, a recent discovery shows that Massospondylus possessed well-developed clavicles that were joined in a furcula-like arrangement, acting like a clasp between the right and left shoulder blades and prohibiting any rotation of these bones. This discovery indicates that the clavicle reduction is limited to the evolutionary line leading to the ceratopsians. It also indicates that the furcula of birds is derived from clavicles.

Michael Cooper (1981) noted that the zygapophyses of the neck vertebrae were inclined, prohibiting significant horizontal movement of the neck, so that "consequently any significant movement in this direction must have been accomplished by a change in the position of the entire body". This was contradicted in a recent study, noting that only the basalmost cervicals show inclined zygapophyses, allowing sufficient horizontal movement of the neck as a whole.

Reproduction

In 1976, a clutch of seven 190-million-year-old Massospondylus eggs was found in Golden Gate Highlands National Park in South Africa by James Kitching, who identified them as most likely belonging to Massospondylus. It was nearly 30 years before extraction was started on the fossils of the 15-centimetre- (6 in-) long embryos. They remain the oldest dinosaur embryos ever found. By early 2012, at least 10 egg clutches from at least four fossiliferous horizons had been found, with up to 34 eggs per clutch. This indicates that this nesting site may have been used repeatedly (site fidelity), by groups of animals (colonial nesting); in both cases, these represent the oldest evidence of this behaviour. Sedimentary structures indicate that the nesting area was in the vicinity of a lake. The eggshells were very thin (about 0.1 mm), allowing gas exchange even in a low oxygen and carbon dioxide rich environment, which indicates that the eggs were at least partly buried in the substrate. There are no hints that Massospondylus constructed nests; however, the arrangement of the eggs in tight rows indicates that the eggs were pushed in this position by the adults.

The embryos probably represented near-hatchlings. While the skeletal features were similar to those of the adults, the body proportions were very dissimilar. The head was big with a short snout and very large orbits, whose diameter amounts 39% of the entire skull length. The neck was short, contrasting to the very long neck in the adults. Girdle bones and caudals were relatively tiny. The forelimbs were of equal length to the hindlimbs, indicating that newly hatched Massospondylus were quadrupedal, unlike the bipedal adults. However, the reliability of these results has been questioned. The discovery of hatching footprints with manus impressions confirmed their quadrupedality. These impressions show that the hand was not pronated, with palm faces facing each other and the thumb facing forwards. The unpronated manus and the big head indicate that an effective locomotion was not possible for newly hatched Massospondylus. Notably, the near-hatchings had no teeth, suggesting they had no way of feeding themselves. Based on the lack of teeth and the ineffective locomotion, scientists speculate that postnatal care might have been necessary. This is further supported by evidence that the hatchings remained at the nest sites until they had doubled in size.

Newly hatched juveniles are known from a second sauropodomorph, Mussaurus; these remains resemble those of the embryonic Massospondylus, suggesting that quadrupedality was present in newly hatched Mussaurus and presumably other basal sauropodomorphs as well. The quadrupedality of the hatchings suggests that the quadrupedal posture of later sauropods may have evolved from retention of juvenile characteristics in adult animals, an evolutionary phenomenon known as paedomorphosis. This discovery therefore "sheds some light in the evolutionary pathways through which the peculiar adaptations of giant dinosaurs were attained", stated French paleontologist Eric Buffetaut. However, a recent study, which evaluated locomotion in extinct taxa based on limb robusticity, found that previous conclusions that Massospondylus transitioned from quadrupedality to bipedality through ontogeny were based on unreliable allometric comparisons between limb lengths, but a model based on the circumferences of the humerus and femur supported bipedality throughout ontogeny.

Respiratory system
Many saurischian dinosaurs possessed vertebrae and ribs that contained hollowed-out cavities (pneumatic foramina), which reduced the weight of the bones and may have served as a basic 'flow-through ventilation' system similar to that of modern birds. In such a system, the neck vertebrae and ribs are hollowed out by the cervical air sac; the upper back vertebrae, by the lung; and the lower back and sacral (hip) vertebrae, by the abdominal air sac. These organs constitute a complex and very efficient method of respiration. "Prosauropods" are the only major group of saurischians without an extensive system of pneumatic foramina. Although possible pneumatic indentations have been found in Plateosaurus and Thecodontosaurus, the indentations were very small. One study in 2007 concluded that basal sauropodomorphs like Massospondylus likely had abdominal and cervical air sacs, based on the evidence for them in sister taxa (theropods and sauropods). The study concluded that it was impossible to determine whether basal sauropodomorphs had a bird-like flow-through lung, but that the air sacs were almost certainly present.

Paleoecology
The faunas and floras of the Early Jurassic were similar worldwide, with conifers adapted for hot weather becoming the common plants; basal sauropodomorphs and theropods were the main constituents of a worldwide dinosaur fauna. The environment of early Jurassic southern Africa has been described as a desert. African Massospondylus was a contemporary of temnospondyli; turtles; a sphenodont; rauisuchids; early crocodylomorphs; tritylodontid and trithelodontid therapsids; morganucodontid mammals; and dinosaurs including the small theropod Coelophysis rhodesiensis and several genera of early ornithischians, such as Lesothosaurus and the heterodontosaurids Abrictosaurus, Heterodontosaurus, Lycorhinus and Pegomastax. Until recently, Massospondylus was regarded as the only known sauropodomorph from the Upper Elliot Formation. However, newer finds revealed a diverse contemporary sauropodomorph fauna with six additional species, including Ignavusaurus, Arcusaurus and two unnamed taxa as well as two unnamed sauropods.

It is not clear which carnivores may have preyed on Massospondylus. Most of the theropods that have been discovered in rocks of Early Jurassic age in southern Africa, such as Coelophysis, were smaller than mid-sized sauropodomorphs like Massospondylus. These smaller predators have been postulated as using fast slashing attacks to wear down sauropodomorphs, which could have defended themselves with their large hand and foot claws. The 6-metre-(20 ft-) long carnivorous theropod Dracovenator lived during the same period (Hettangian to Sinemurian stages) as Massospondylus and has also been found in the Elliot Formation of South Africa.

References

Further reading

 
 
 Hinic, S. (2002). "The cranial anatomy of Massospondylus carinatus Owen, 1854 and its implications for prosauropod phylogeny". Journal of Vertebrate Paleontology. Abstracts of papers. Society of Vertebrate Paleontology, 22, Supplement to number 3, 65A.
 Martínez, R. (1999). "The first South American record of Massospondylus (Dinosauria: Sauropodomorpha)". Journal of Vertebrate Paleontology, Abstracts of papers. Society of Vertebrate Paleontology, 20–23 October, 19, Suppl. 3, 61A.
 Martínez, R.N. (1999). "Massospondylus (Dinosauria: Sauropodomorpha) in northwestern Argentina". Abstracts VII International Symposium on Mesozoic Terrestrial Ecosystems, Buenos Aires, 40.

External links

Locomotion and Ontogeny of Massospondylus carinatus from the University of Toronto at Missisauga.
Massospondylidae from Palaeos.com (technical).
Massospondylus from PrimeOrigins.co.za (for children).
"Oldest known dinosaur embryos identified" University of the Witwatersrand.
 National Geographic''.

Massospondylidae
Hettangian life
Pliensbachian life
Sinemurian life
Early Jurassic dinosaurs of Africa
Jurassic South Africa
Fossils of South Africa
Fossil taxa described in 1854
Taxa named by Richard Owen